Abdulkader Mjarmesh (born 25 June 1988) is a Syrian footballer who plays for Salalah SC in Oman First Division League.

Club career
On 22 September 2014, he signed a one-year contract with Oman Professional League club, Al-Nasr S.C.S.C. On 18 January 2015, he was released by Al-Nasr S.C.S.C.

Club career statistics

References

External links
 
 Abdulkader Mjarmesh at Goal.com
 
 

1988 births
Living people
Sportspeople from Homs
Syrian footballers
Syria international footballers
Syrian expatriate footballers
Association football midfielders
Al-Nasr SC (Salalah) players
Salalah SC players
Oman Professional League players
Expatriate footballers in Jordan
Syrian expatriate sportspeople in Jordan
Expatriate footballers in Oman
Syrian expatriate sportspeople in Oman
Syrian Premier League players